The Raystown Branch Juniata River is the largest and longest tributary of the Juniata River in south-central Pennsylvania in the United States.

The Raystown Branch Juniata River begins along the Allegheny Front in Somerset County and flows  to the confluence with the Juniata River near Huntingdon. It passes through the boroughs of Bedford and Everett along its course.

Bridges
 The Diehls Covered Bridge crosses Raystown Branch Juniata River in Harrison Township, Pennsylvania.
 The Bridge in Snake Spring Township crosses Raystown Branch Juniata River in Snake Spring Township, Pennsylvania.
 The Corbin Bridge crosses Raystown Branch Juniata River in Juniata Township, Pennsylvania.

Tributaries
(Heading downstream)
Breastwork Run
Dunning Creek
Cove Creek
Bloody Run
Brush Creek
Yellow Creek
Great Trough Creek

See also
List of rivers of Pennsylvania
Shawnee State Park (Pennsylvania)
Warriors Path State Park
Trough Creek State Park
Bloody Run Canoe Classic
The Narrows (Pennsylvania)

References

External links
U.S. Geological Survey: PA stream gaging stations

Rivers of Pennsylvania
Tributaries of the Juniata River
Rivers of Somerset County, Pennsylvania
Rivers of Huntingdon County, Pennsylvania
Rivers of Bedford County, Pennsylvania